The Peach Orchard is a double live album by American jazz bassist William Parker and his group In Order to Survive, which was recorded at various venues in New York City in 1997-98 and released on the AUM Fidelity label.

Reception

In his review for AllMusic, Tom Schulte states "This cream of the New York, contemporary, free jazz scene veers from such challenging, busy compositions as the explosive first track "Thoth" to such reflective pieces as "Moholo," basically a study in rhythmic intricacy". The JazzTimes review noted "the quartet-rounded out by alto saxophonist Rob Brown, pianist Cooper-Moore, and drummer Susie Ibarra-interprets Parker's often daunting structures with a fiery clarity".

Track listing
All compositions by William Parker

Disc One:  
 "Thot" - 14:12 
 "Moholo" - 18:51
 "Three Clay Pots" - 15:24
 "The Peach Orchard" - 20:45 
 
Disc Two: 
 "Posium Pendasem #3" - 11:36
 "Leaf Dance" - 25:28 
 "Theme from Pelikan" - 17:10 
 "In Order to Survive" - 12:24
  
Tracks 2-2 & 2-3 recorded direct to DAT at Alterknit, NYC on February 7, 1997. 
Tracks 1-2, 1-3 & 2-4 recorded on 8-track at Knitting Factory, NYC on July 2, 1997. 
Tracks 1-1 & 1-4 recorded on 8-track at Context, NYC on March 20, 1998. 
Track 2-1 recorded on 8-track at Context, NYC on March 21, 1998.

Personnel
William Parker - bass
Rob Brown - alto saxophone 
Cooper-Moore - piano
Susie Ibarra - drums
Assif Tsahar - bass clarinet on Disc Two, track #1

References

1998 live albums
AUM Fidelity live albums
William Parker (musician) live albums
Albums recorded at the Knitting Factory